Raymond Ka-Sing Tsang, better known by his in-game name kaSing, is a British-Hong Kong professional League of Legends player who  plays as the support for Excel Esports' academy team, BT Excel.

Career 
KaSing joined H2k-Gaming ahead of the 2015 Spring EU LCS. Tsang joined TSM of the League of Legends Championship Series North America as the support and debuted with TSM at Intel Extreme Masters Season X - San Jose. He left after disappointing results from IEM San Jose and was replaced by former Fnatic player Bora "YellowStar" Kim. Soon afterwards, KaSing was picked up by Team Vitality upon the organization's buying of Gambit Gaming's EU LCS spot.

Tournament results

Team Vitality 
 3rd — 2016 EU LCS Spring Split
 5–6th — 2016 EU LCS Spring Playoffs

References

External links 
 

Living people
Dignitas (esports) players
G2 Esports players
H2k-Gaming players
Team Vitality players
British esports players
Year of birth missing (living people)